The 2010 Penn Quakers football team represented the University of Pennsylvania in the 2010 NCAA Division I FCS football season. The Quakers were led by 19th-year head coach Al Bagnoli and played their home games at Franklin Field in Philadelphia. They finished the season 9–1 overall and 7–0 in Ivy League play, winning the conference title.

Schedule

References

Penn
Penn Quakers football seasons
Ivy League football champion seasons
Penn Quakers football